Diomício Freitas/Forquilhinha Airport  previously SBCM, is the airport serving Criciúma, Brazil, located in the adjoining municipality of Forquilhinha. It is named after Diomício Manoel de Freitas (1911-1981), a local entrepreneur and politician.

It is operated by Infracea.

History
The airport was opened on December 17, 1979.

Airlines and destinations
No scheduled flights operate at this airport.

Access

See also

List of airports in Brazil

References

External links

Airports in Santa Catarina (state)
Airports established in 1979